Mary Ellen Clark (born December 25, 1962) is an American diver who won Olympic bronze medals in diving at the 1992 and 1996 Summer Olympics.

Background
Clark attended Radnor High School, in Radnor, Pennsylvania. She received her B.S. in Health and Physical Education from Pennsylvania State University and her M.S. in  Health and Physical Education from Ohio State University.

Career
Clark was "voted one of the top-10 women athletes in the country by the United States Olympic Committee in 1996" by the USOC. Clark's career also includes a stint as a member of the United States National Diving Team since 1996. She was also a three-time member of the United States Pan American Team and a seven-time National Champion.

However, Clark suffered with Vertigo, resulting in dizzy spells. She went through natural holistic therapies to cure her disorder. ( Source: "Radical Cures." from A&E Channel program. "Mysteries of the Unexplained". uploaded from doc spots in YouTube)

She has been the Head Diving Coach at Amherst College and Mount Holyoke College since 2004, and is the diving coach at Amherst Regional High School (Amherst, Massachusetts).  In 2008, Clark received New England Small College Athletic Conference Diving Coach of the Year honors, as well as NCAA Division III Diving Coach of the Year honors. She also coached 3 Amherst College divers to NCAA Division III Nationals qualifications in the 2007–2008 season, and one of her divers, Kai Robinson, was the 2008 NCAA Division III Men's National Diving Champion on both the 1 and 3 meter boards for 2008–09.  She coached the Wellesley College diving team beginning in the 2012 school year through the 2014 season.

See also
List of Pennsylvania State University Olympians
List of divers

References

External links
databaseolympics.com

1962 births
Living people
People from Abington Township, Montgomery County, Pennsylvania
American female divers
Divers at the 1992 Summer Olympics
Divers at the 1996 Summer Olympics
Olympic bronze medalists for the United States in diving
Ohio State University College of Education and Human Ecology alumni
Ohio State Buckeyes women's divers
Mount Holyoke College faculty
American motivational speakers
Women motivational speakers
People from Radnor Township, Pennsylvania
Medalists at the 1996 Summer Olympics
Medalists at the 1992 Summer Olympics
Penn State College of Education alumni
American women academics
Penn State Nittany Lions men's swimmers